Swansea Bay may refer to the following places
Swansea Bay, a bay on the north of the Bristol Channel
Swansea Beach the stretch of beach lining the Swansea Bay inlet between Swansea Docks and the Mumbles
Swansea Bay (region), a region of Wales designated by the Welsh Assembly Government for policy planning
Swansea Bay City Region, a local authority partnership in south west Wales.
Swansea Bay railway station, a former station closed under the Beeching Axe.

See also:
Swansea Bay Radio, a radio station broadcasting to the Swansea Bay region
Swansea Bay Film Festival, an annual film festival held in Swansea, Wales
Swansea Bay Golf Club, a golf club near the village of Jersey Marine, Wales
Tidal Lagoon Swansea Bay, proposed tidal lagoon power plant